Râpa may refer to several villages in Romania:

 Râpa, a village in Tinca Commune, Bihor County
 Râpa, a village in the town of Motru, Gorj County
 Râpa de Jos, a village in Vătava Commune, Mureș County